Kathy Coleman (born August 6, 1980, in Sheridan, Wyoming) is an American politician and a Republican member of the Wyoming House of Representatives representing District 30 since October 3, 2012, when she was appointed by the Sheridan County Commissioners to fill the vacancy caused by the resignation of Representative Jon Botten.

Elections
2012 Coleman was unopposed for both the August 21, 2012 Republican Primary, winning with 1,179 votes, and the November 6, 2012 General election, winning with 3,625 votes.

References

External links
Official page at the Wyoming Legislature
 

1980 births
Living people
Republican Party members of the Wyoming House of Representatives
People from Sheridan, Wyoming
Women state legislators in Wyoming
21st-century American women